Buckhurst Hill was a local government district in south west Essex, England from 1894 to 1933. It contained the town and Civil Parish of Buckhurst Hill and was bordered by Loughton Urban District, Chingford Urban District and Wanstead and Woodford Urban District.

References

Political history of Essex
Epping Forest District
Urban districts of England